Personal Column is an Australian television program. It aired on Melbourne station HSV-7, broadcast weekly at 4:00PM on Wednesdays from 27 August 1958 to 6 May 1959. Episodes aired in a 15-minute time-slot. It was replaced on the schedule by Brenda's Time with HSV personality Brenda Marshall, a program about which very little information is available. The archival status of either program is not known. It should not be confused with Personal Album, a GTV-9 series which also aired from 1958 to 1959.

Format
It appears to have originally been hosted by Brenda Marshall, but most episodes featured Jean Battersby as the host. The program had a format similar to newspaper personal column sections, with Battersby discussing viewers personal problems.

At the time, most Australian programs aired in a single city only, which was also the case with Personal Column.

See also
Movie Guide
What's On

References

External links

Seven Network original programming
1958 Australian television series debuts
1959 Australian television series endings
English-language television shows
Black-and-white Australian television shows
Australian non-fiction television series